Anastasiya Pobegaylo (born 23 January 2004) is a Belarusian footballer who plays as a forward for Belarusian Premier League club FC Minsk and the Belarus women's national team.

References

2004 births
Living people
People from Lyakhavichy
Belarusian women's footballers
Women's association football forwards
FC Minsk (women) players
Belarus women's international footballers
Sportspeople from Brest Region